Eames and Young was an American architecture firm based in St. Louis, Missouri, active nationally, and responsible for several buildings on the National Register of Historic Places.

History 
The principals were Thomas Crane Young, FAIA and William Sylvester Eames, FAIA. Young was born in Sheboygan, Wisconsin, and came to St. Louis to attend Washington University, then spent two years at the Ecole des Beaux Arts in 1880, and briefly worked for the Boston firm of Van Brunt & Howe. Eames had come to St. Louis as a child, attended the St. Louis School of Fine Arts, and served as Deputy Commissioner of Public Buildings for the city.

They formed a partnership in 1885. Their first works were elaborate mansions for Vandeventer Place and other private places in St. Louis, which led to an important series of landmark downtown warehouses, later collectively known as Cupples Station.  Eames was elected president of the American Institute of Architects in 1904–05. Through the 1900s and 1910s, the firm designed several St. Louis skyscrapers and built a reputation for offices, schools, and institutional buildings constructed nationwide.

Eames died in 1915. Young's last building was the colossal 1926 St. Louis Masonic Temple on Lindell, and he quit practice in 1927. Their papers are held by the Art and Architecture Library at Washington University Libraries.  

Eames was the uncle of American designer Charles Eames.

Work 
 Cupples Stations Warehouses, St. Louis, 1892-1915
 Lindell Pavilion, Forest Park, St. Louis, 1892
 United States Penitentiary, Leavenworth, Kansas, 1895
 Mississippi Valley Trust (now Schupp Building), St. Louis, 1896
 United States Penitentiary, Atlanta, Georgia, 1902
 Frisco Building, St. Louis, Missouri, 1903–04
 Palace of Education, Louisiana Purchase Exposition, St. Louis, 1904 (razed)
 The Alaska Building, the first steel-frame high-rise in Seattle, Washington, 1904
 Wright Building, St. Louis, 1906 (later joined to the Arcade Building in 1919)
 Ely Walker Lofts, St. Louis, 1907
 The Josephinum, Seattle, Washington, 1908
 The Hotchkiss Chapel, Bellefontaine Cemetery, St. Louis, Missouri 1909
 Corby–Forsee Building, St. Joseph, Missouri, 1910
 United States Customs House, San Francisco, California, circa 1911
 Walker Center, aka the Walker Bank Building, Salt Lake City, Utah, 1912
 Marquette Building (St. Louis), aka the Boatmen's Bank Building, 1914
 Masonic Temple, St. Louis, with Albert B. Groves as associate, 1926

References 

Architecture firms based in Missouri
Companies based in St. Louis
1885 establishments in Missouri